Scott Pawson (born 21 December 1974) is a New Zealand cricketer. He played in eleven first-class and three List A matches for Canterbury from 1995 to 1999.

See also
 List of Canterbury representative cricketers

References

External links
 

1974 births
Living people
New Zealand cricketers
Canterbury cricketers
Cricketers from Christchurch